Carlos Jorge Fortes Magalhães Medina Vasconcelos (born 24 October 1984), commonly known as Tunha or Tunha Lam, is a Portuguese professional futsal player who plays for Torreense and the Portugal national team as a pivot.

References

External links

1984 births
Living people
Portuguese men's futsal players